The LG Cup Iran is an exhibition association football tournament that took place in Tehran, Iran in 2001.

The participants were

 South Africa B

Venues

Results

Semifinals

Third place match

Final

Scorers
 3 goal
 Sirous Dinmohammadi
 2 goal
  Dželaludin Muharemović
  Ali Daei
  Mehdi Hasheminasab
  B Makhubela
 1 goal
  Admir Adžem 
  Ramiz Husić
  Abdullah Al-Sa'adi
  Fawzi Bashir Doorbeen
  Nabil Al-Dabet
  Mohamed Saleh 
  Yahya Golmohammadi
  Ali Karimi

See also
LG Cup

References

2001
2001–02 in Iranian football
2001–02 in Bosnia and Herzegovina football
2001–02 in Omani football
2001–02 in South African soccer